Busta is a Czech surname. Notable people with the surname include:

 Christine Busta (1915–1987), Austrian lyricist
 Pablo Carreño Busta (born 1991), Spanish tennis player
 Zbyněk Busta (born 1967), Czech footballer

See also 
 Busta (disambiguation)

Czech-language surnames
Slavic-language surnames